Unatù Endisciau was an Ethiopian soldier who served in the Italian Army during World War II. He was one of only two colonial subjects to be awarded the Gold Medal of Military Valor, Italy's highest award for bravery. Unatù served as a Muntaz in the LXXII Zaptié Corps.

Following the surrender of the Debra Tabor garrison, Endisciau and some other colonial soldiers refused to surrender their battalion's banner and instead attempted to reach Italian lines at Kulkaber 106 kilometers away; Endisciau led the group there. Along the way they were harassed by local guerrillas supporting the Allies and Endisciau was briefly captured by a guerrilla leader but escaped. As they reached Kulkaber, Endisciau was wounded when attempting to cross an Italian minefield; he was taken to the infirmary after insisting that his comrades deliver the banner. He died shortly thereafter, declaring that he was glad to reach Italian lines and see his banner remain in Italian hands.

References

Year of birth missing
1941 deaths
Italian military personnel killed in World War II
Ethiopian military personnel
Place of birth missing
Recipients of the Gold Medal of Military Valor